Gabriel Luis "Luigi" Romualdez Quisumbing (born July 12, 1979
) is a Filipino politician, who served as Mayor of Mandaue from 2016 to 2019 and was the representative of the 6th district of Cebu from 2010 to 2016.

Private life 
Representative Quisumbing is a relative of the Lopez-Romualdez family. He is the grandson of Norberto B. Quisumbing Jr., who started the large Norkis Trading Corp. and that of the Norkis Group of Companies.

Congressman Quisumbing married Maricar Hofileña on 7 March 2015 at the St. Joseph Parish in Mandaue City.

Political life 

Following the steps that most of his kinsmen took, Congressman Luigi joined the political arena in 2007 as a Provincial Board Member in the Province of Cebu, representing the 6th District. He later on moved to become the House Representative for the same district in 2010. He has since been re-elected to the same Congressional position in 2013, serving his second term. He is a former member of One Cebu Party and was later sworn in to be a member of the ruling Liberal Party (LP) in 2012.

He was the candidate of the Liberal Party for the mayoralty position of Mandaue City in the 2016 election, together with Atty. Carlo Fortuna as his Vice Mayor. Rep. Quisumbing endorsed incumbent Mandaue City Mayor Jonas Cortes to run as House Representative for the 6th district of Cebu. Quisumbing, Fortuna, Cortes and their whole slate took oath as the representatives of the Liberal Party in Mandaue and the 6th District respectively on October 12, 2015.

Congressional performance 
In 2012, first-termer Rep. Quisumbing laid bare his plans and goals for the 6th District of Cebu during a newspaper interview. His 4-point agenda became the guiding principles of his vision for the District:
 Higher - Provide for a better and quality standard of education, health, infrastructure and social services in the 6th District. 
 Faster - Eliminate bureaucracy in the delivery of basic services. Ensure that the delivery of these services will be delivered immediately to all constituents of the 6th District, right where and when they need it. 
 Stronger - Strengthen government institutions as pillars of education, health, public works and social development to guarantee progress in the district. Work - for a unified district and stability in government as an indicator of progress and development.
 Better - Eradicate corruption in government service and promote transparency in all government transactions especially in the implementation of its programs and projects involving the use of public funds. Encourage participation of local government units and other sectors in development planning and meetings.

Aside from legislative work, Rep. Quisumbing finds time to be with his constituents, either for people-centered consultations or extending aid during dire situations. However, Congressman Luigi is best known among his constituents as a caring big brother, especially to kids, whom he admittedly finds the best inspiration for his job as a House Representative.

Next steps 
Having been elected as Mayor of Mandaue City for July 2016 to June 2019, Quisumbing committed himself to realize the platform of governance he announced during the campaign period of 2016.  Quisumbing has formed his transition team that will identify the people to fill-up key positions in the City Hall for the next three years under his leadership.

References

Members of the House of Representatives of the Philippines from Cebu
People from Mandaue
University of San Carlos alumni
1979 births
Living people